Goyegaon is a village in the Karmala taluka of Solapur district in Maharashtra state, India.

Demographics
Covering  and comprising 174 households at the time of the 2011 census of India, Goyegaon had a population of 842. There were 434 males and 408 females, with 80 people being aged six or younger.

References

Villages in Karmala taluka